Westbrook railway station was a station on the Western Line in Auckland, New Zealand, between Waikomiti station and Glen Eden station. It was opened on 6 September 1957. It was closed at the same time as the Croydon Road and St George's Street stations, also on the Western Line, on a six-month trial basis on 18 August 1980, with the closure being made permanent on 16 August 1981.

See also
 List of Auckland railway stations

References

Rail transport in Auckland
Defunct railway stations in New Zealand
West Auckland, New Zealand